Jeon Seung-min (born 15 December 2000) is a South Korean footballer who plays as a midfielder for Jeonnam Dragons, on loan from Seongnam FC.

Career statistics

Club

References

2000 births
Living people
South Korean footballers
South Korea under-17 international footballers
Association football midfielders
Yong In University alumni
K League 1 players
K League 2 players
Seongnam FC players
Jeonnam Dragons players